Snail mail refers to packages sent via conventional postal delivery. It may also refer to:

 Snail Mail (video game), a video game
 Snail Mail (musician), a musician

See also
 Snail Mail No More, title of a book
 "Snail Mail", the title of a 2016 episode of SpongeBob SquarePants's ninth season